Siren (stylized as SiREN) is a 2016 American horror film directed by Gregg Bishop and written by Ben Collins and Luke Piotrowski. It is the first spin-off film in the V/H/S franchise and feature-length adaptation of "Amateur Night", David Bruckner's segment from the 2012 anthology horror film V/H/S. It was released on December 2, 2016 in theatres, on DVD on December 6, 2016 and on Netflix January 1, 2020. The film focuses on Jonah (Chase Williamson) and his groomsmen the day before his wedding, as they embark on a wild night of partying and debauchery. The party, however, becomes a savage fight for survival when they unwittingly unleash a fabled predator upon the festivities.

Plot

One week before his wedding day, Jonah goes out with his brother Mac and friends Rand and Elliot for his stag party. As the host, Mac takes them to a lackluster strip club, leaving them disappointed. Mac is approached by a stranger, who tells him about an underground moving club that promises to surpass all expectations. Reluctantly, they all agree to go. 

After arriving, they are unnerved by the patrons and dancers and almost decide to leave until the club owner, Mr. Nyx, comes out to personally welcome and see to their entertainment. Upon hearing that Jonah wants a non-cheating experience, Nyx takes him into another while his groomsmen pay. As payment, he asks from each of the three men their favorite memories of their mothers. At the window, Jonah sees a nude young woman on the other side of a glass window. He tries to talk to her and she begins singing. Jonah, in a trance, suddenly relives all the sexual encounters he has ever had at once. Meanwhile, Elliot has a custom drink with a leech in it and suddenly experiences the memory of murdering someone, after which both Mac and Rand realize they all have matching marks on the back of their necks.

Before he can go, Jonah hears the girl ask him not to leave and sees that the door to the room is padlocked from the outside. Fearing that the girl is a sex slave, Jonah gets Rand to help and instructs the others to wait in the car. After opening the door, the three attempt to leave, but are stopped by a guard. Rand fights him off while Jonah and the girl hide in a bathroom. Once there, the girl uses the keys she stole from one of the guards to open a shackle around her ankle, then brutally kills the guard that followed them, revealing claws and a long tail. Frightened, Jonah meets up with Rand and they both escape to the car before driving off.

The girl then crashes on top of the car and drags Elliot away. Nyx and his posse arrive and kidnap Rand as Jonah and Mac escape. Back at the club, Nyx questions Rand, asking why they released "Lilith" before allowing the brother of the murdered guard to torture him. Out in the woods, Jonah and Mac desperately try to find Elliot while attempting to hide from Lilith. Eventually they find  a diner and run into a pair of cops. While trying to explain what happened, Mac noticing a similar mark on the cops necks, realizing that they work for Nyx. When Lilith appears, Jonah puts in his headphones to drown out her singing while she murders both cops. She grabs Jonah and flying away as Mac helplessly watches.

The two land in a quarry where she rapes him, creating a fantasy of him having sex with his fiancé, Eva. When he comes back to himself, Jonah runs from the now sleeping Lilith and makes it back to his hotel room. There he encounters the female bartender, revealed to be a Gorgon. She forces him to drink the leech containing Rand's memories of being tortured and sees a memory of Nyx speaking directly to him and offering a trade; the girl for Rand. Jonah agrees and follows her to the church. Once there, Nyx reveals that Lilith is actually a succubus that was summoned and imprisoned by Nyx. The church is where she was originally summoned and Nyx needs Jonah to lure her into a rune circle and reattach the shackle around her ankle to bind her to his will again, as she has become infatuated with him.

Lilith arrives and hesitantly steps into the circle. To Nyx's anger, Jonah says he will not put the shackle on if she will let Jonah go. Lilith agrees, and proceeds to slaughter Nyx's henchmen, while Jonah grabs a seriously injured Rand. Mac arrives and sacrifices himself to save his brother from a vengeful Nyx before the latter is killed by Lilith. She kisses Jonah goodbye, and watches from above the church doors while Jonah and Rand escape.

A year later, Jonah and Eva are celebrating their anniversary. After making love, Jonah goes downstairs and sees Eva asleep on the couch, realizing that it was Lilith in bed with him. Jonah attempts to get Lilith to leave until Eva wakes up. Enraged, Lilith starts to attack her. Begging for mercy, Jonah says he will go with her if she spares Eve. Lilith grabs Jonah, and they fly off into the night as Eva watches in horror.

Cast

Production
In May 2015, Chiller Films slated Siren,  a V/H/S spinoff of the segment "Amateur Night", written by Ben Collins and Luke Piotrowski, would premiere in 2016. In August 2015, Ain't it Cool News reported that production was underway in Savannah, Georgia, with Hannah Fierman reprising her role and Gregg Bishop serving as director. David Bruckner, creator of the original segment, was initially slated to direct, but would ultimately pass on the offer due to his involvement on an unmade Friday the 13th reboot. Producer Brad Miska then offered the film to Bishop, who both previously collaborated on V/H/S: Viral. Bruckner was heavily involved with the project, serving as an executive producer, second unit director, and oversaw the development of the screenplay with Collins and Piotrowski. The filmmakers opted not to use the found footage format to differentiate the feature from the short film.

Even though the studio was pushing for other actresses for the role of Lily, director Gregg Bishop insisted that Hannah Fierman reprise her role as Lily, stating that she was the primary reason that the character was so iconic in the short. Fierman was initially hesitant to return to the role of Lily, but would ultimately sign on to the project after being drawn in by Bruckner's pitch. The actress also partook in auditioning for the role during casting.

For the parts of the movie where Lily sings, the filmmakers decided in pre-production to utilize Hannah Fierman's singing voice. She would lip sync to a guide track for the first take to just get the melody and timing of the song (the filmmakers never intending to use that take), then in the following takes she would sing it for real. Justin Welborn was cast as Mr. Nyx, who also starred in Bruckner's film The Signal and Bishop's Dance of the Dead.

The film was scheduled for 18 days and budgeted under a half million dollars. Post-production was rushed and as a result several final visual FX shots were not approved by the director because the post house had to cut them in and deliver the movie.

Release
Siren was released on December 2, 2016 by Chiller Films. and then released on DVD on December 6, 2016 by Universal Home Video. The film was subsequently released on Netflix on January 1, 2020.

Reception
On review aggregator Rotten Tomatoes, Siren holds a 65% approval rating based on 20 critics, with an average rating of 5.30/10. On Metacritic, the film holds a 54 out of 100, indicating "mixed or average reviews".

According to We Got This Covered and FlixPatrol, SiREN reached the Top 10 in eight different countries on Netflix.

Ain't It Cool News called SiREN a "rock solid monster movie with a strong ensemble cast", the Los Angeles Times hailed it a "clever and confident expansion of a terrific short." We Are Indie Horror called it a "phenomenal and intense adaptation of "Amateur Night" that far surpasses the short in tone and action. SiREN stands on its own and is a must-see". Horror Freak News named SiREN as one of the "top horror movies of 2016".

References

External links
 

2016 horror films
American supernatural horror films
Supernatural fantasy films
American dark fantasy films
American monster movies
Demons in film
Film spin-offs
Films with screenplays by Ben Collins (writer)
Films with screenplays by David Bruckner
Films with screenplays by Luke Piotrowski
2010s English-language films
2010s monster movies
2010s American films
V/H/S (franchise)